Leo Moser (11 April 1921, Vienna – 9 February 1970, Edmonton) was an Austrian-Canadian mathematician, best known for his polygon notation.

A native of Vienna, Leo Moser immigrated with his parents to Canada at the age of three. He received his Bachelor of Science degree from the University of Manitoba in 1943, and a Master of Science from the University of Toronto in 1945. After two years of teaching he went to the University of North Carolina to complete a PhD, supervised by Alfred Brauer. There, in 1950, he began suffering recurrent heart problems.  He took a position at Texas Technical College for one year, and joined the faculty of the University of Alberta in 1951, where he remained until his death at the age of 48.

In 1966, Moser posed the question "What is the region of smallest area which will accommodate every planar arc of length one?".  Rephrased to consider the planar arc a "worm", this became known as Moser's worm problem and is still an open problem in discrete geometry.

See also
 Erdős–Moser equation
 Lambek–Moser theorem
 Moser spindle
 Moser–de Bruijn sequence
 Moving sofa problem
 Moser's Circle Problem

References

External links

Posthumous biographical appreciation, dated May 19, 1970, by mathematician Max Wyman, president of the University of Alberta from 1969 to 1974
Comprehensive list of 88 papers, lectures and other works authored by Leo Moser
April 1961 photograph of Leo Moser

Recreational mathematicians
1921 births
1970 deaths
Academic staff of the University of Alberta
Austrian emigrants to Canada
University of Manitoba alumni
University of Toronto alumni
University of North Carolina at Chapel Hill alumni
20th-century Canadian mathematicians
Canadian expatriates in the United States